Großenhain Cottbus station was opened on 14 October 1862 by the Großenhain Branch Railway Company (Zweig-Eisenbahngesellschaft zu Großenhain) as the Leipzig station (Leipziger Bahnhof), located on the line from Priestewitz to Cottbus.

History 
The line from Großenhain to Cottbus was opened on 20 April 1870. The 920-metre-long rail link to the Berlin station (Großenhain Berliner Bahnhof) was opened on 17 June 1875.

Since 15 December 2002, all passenger services have operated through the Cottbus line station and the Berlin line station has been closed as a stop for passenger services. In addition, a modern interchange for regional and city bus has been built by Kreisverkehrsgesellschaft Riesa-Großenhain, the company in charge of the management of buses in the district.

Description
The station is equipped with two platform tracks for passenger services and two mainline tracks for freight traffic. Between the tracks a roundhouse still existed until December 2007.

There are several sidings for freight, as well as two local branch lines. One branch line was used by the Agro Service Großenhain and runs for a few meters parallel with the Berlin–Dresden railway towards Böhla.

The second branch line runs to the north of the main track towards Lampertswalde and previously connected with the airfield and the former paper mill. The siding from the paper mill was used for several years by the ITL Eisenbahngesellschaft of Dresden and served a recycling facility. Currently no freight is handled at Großenhain.

Services 

The station is now served by the following passenger services:

Notes

Railway stations in Saxony
Railway stations in Germany opened in 1862
Buildings and structures in Meissen (district)